Razakar (رضا کار) is etymologically  an Arabic word which literally means volunteer. The word is also common in Urdu language as a loanword. On the other hand, in Bangladesh, razakar is a pejorative word meaning a traitor or Judas.

In Pakistan and India

Razakars were an East Pakistani paramilitary  force that aided the Pakistan Army against the Mukti Bahini during the Bangladesh Liberation War.

Police Qaumi Razakars are a volunteer force in Pakistan which aids the Police in their duties.

In Hyderabad, Razakars were volunteers sponsored by the Nizam's state of Hyderabad for opposition to its merger with India.

In Bangladesh
In Bengali language, razakar is an ethnic slur mainly towards Pakistanis and Biharis: a pejorative term akin to the western term "traitor" or Judas. The phrase comes from the East Pakistani paramilitary force (see above) who opposed the freedom of Bangladesh.

References

Arabic words and phrases
Bengali words and phrases